In mathematics, Hiptmair–Xu (HX) preconditioners are preconditioners for solving  and  problems based on the auxiliary space preconditioning framework.  An important ingredient in the derivation of HX preconditioners in two and three dimensions is the so-called regular decomposition, which decomposes a Sobolev space function into a component of higher regularity and a scalar or vector potential. The key to the success of HX preconditioners is the discrete version of this decomposition, which is also known as HX decomposition.  The discrete decomposition decomposes a discrete Sobolev space function into a discrete component of higher regularity, a discrete scale or vector potential, and a high-frequency component.  

HX preconditioners have been used for accelerating a wide variety of solution techniques, thanks to their highly scalable parallel implementations, and are known as AMS and ADS precondition.  HX preconditioner was identified by the U.S. Department of Energy as one of the top ten breakthroughs in computational science in recent years. Researchers from Sandia, Los Alamos, and Lawrence Livermore National Labs use this algorithm for modeling fusion with magnetohydrodynamic equations. Moreover, this approach will also be instrumental in developing optimal iterative methods in structural mechanics, electrodynamics, and modeling of complex flows.

HX preconditioner for 

Consider the following   problem: Find   such that 

The corresponding matrix form is

The HX preconditioner for  problem is defined as

Based on auxiliary space preconditioning framework, one can show that 

where  denotes the condition number of matrix .  

In practice, inverting  and  might be expensive, especially for large scale problems. And the HX preconditioner for  becomes

HX Preconditioner for 
Consider the following  problem: Find 

The corresponding matrix form is

The HX preconditioner for  problem is defined as

Based on the auxiliary space preconditioning framework, one can show that 

Moreover, inverting  might be expensive and we can replace it by a spectrally equivalent approximations . These leads to the following practical HX preconditioner for problem,

Derivation

Theorem:[Discrete regular decomposition for ]

Let  be a simply connected bounded domain. For any function , there exists a vector, such that
and

Theorem:[Discrete regular decomposition for ]
Let  be a simply connected bounded domain. For any function , there exists a vector 
,  
such that

	and

References 

Polynomials